The following is a list of all team-to-team transactions that have occurred in the National Basketball Association during the 2007–08 NBA season.  It lists what team each player has been traded to, signed by, or claimed by, and for which players or draft picks, if applicable.

Retirement

Trades

Free Agency 

The following is a list of player movement via free agency.

Released

Waived

Training camp cuts
All players listed did not make the final roster.

D-League Assignments
Each NBA team can assign their players with 2 years or less of experience to the team's affiliate NBA D-League team. Players with more than two years of experience may be assigned to the D-League with the players' consent.

Draft

First round

Round Two

Previous years draftees

See also
2007–08 NBA season
2007 NBA draft
2007 in sports
2008 in sports

References

Transactions
NBA transactions